is a Japanese manga series written and illustrated by Yunosuke Yoshinaga since September 12, 2006. Flex Comix published the first tankōbon volume of the manga on April 10, 2007. The manga was previously licensed in North America by CMX, which released three volumes before shutting down. The manga is licensed in Taiwan by Tong Li Publishing. The manga was adapted into six 50 minute animated films. Sentai Filmworks has licensed the movie series and released them on DVD and Blu-ray in 2012. The anime movies are also available online on Crunchyroll.

Plot
The story is centered around a young man named Rygart Arrow, a resident of a world where people can use "magic". This magic is the ability to control and empower quartz, doing many things from creating light to operating machinery to riding giant mecha called 'Golems'. Rygart, however, is one of the few exceptions; as an "un-sorcerer", he cannot utilize quartz, making many aspects of life difficult as well as being looked down upon by the rest of society. Despite this, in his youth he managed to befriend Hodr and Sigyn, the future King and Queen of the Krisna Kingdom; and Zess, the younger brother of the Secretary of War of the Athens Commonwealth.

Years later, Rygart is reunited with Hodr and Sigyn where he learns the Athens Commonwealth has begun an invasion of Krisna. Rygart is also shocked to learn that Zess is leading one of the strike forces. While at the capital, Rygart discovers that he has the ability to pilot a recently discovered ancient Golem which cannot be piloted by magic users. Despite its ancient origins, the golem possesses capabilities and systems far more advanced than the current Golems, and could be key to turning the tide of battle. While hesitant at first, Rygart soon gets involved in the war between Krisna and Athens, in an attempt to save Hodr, Sigyn, and even Zess.

Characters

The Kingdom of Krisna

Rygart is the series' main protagonist at the age of 25. He was born an "un-sorcerer", meaning that he cannot use magic, unlike the majority of his world's populace. Before he left to see Hodr, he worked on a farm with his brother who is also an un-sorcerer, and because of this, his father sold all Quartz operated tools and worked with tools without Quartz to make the boys stronger and to keep them from feeling like outcasts. After his father took out loans, Rygart was able to attend Assam military school where he befriended Zess, Hodr, and Sigyn where the four of them were known as "the four problem children of Assam's Military School", with him being known as the "King of Make-up tests". He hates violence and believes he could win via his opponent tiring out but is willing to fight more directly and violently with his enemies. He becomes the pilot of the Delphine, an ancient Golem designed for only an un-sorcerer's use as a Heavy Knight for Krisna. He originally joins the war to protect his brother and friends, but later admits he is really fighting to protect Sigyn who he really loves. Initially, Rygart is extremely hostile towards Girge when they are teamed up, yet acknowledges the other pilot's skills as a pilot. Rygart eventually comes to recognize Girge as an 'outcast' like himself, and is devastated after Girge sacrifices himself for Rygart. Rygart later spearheads the counter assault on Binonten and has a rematch with Borcuse, this time managing to kill the General, but is left with only more questions about his role in the war. After Borcuse's death, Rygart is promoted to Warrant Officer and given the title, "Hero of Krisna".

Sigyn is the 25-year-old Queen of Krisna and Hodr's wife and a close friend of Rygart. They went to the same military school as him, where she was known as the "Mad Scientist" for secluding herself in the school's lab for up to 3 days and nights at a time without eating or drinking. She pursues a career of science and cares deeply for her friends, to the point of pointing a gun at Rygart upon first seeing him to ask why he did not show up at her wedding and confirm that he does not hate her. While she is the Queen, she rarely acts like one as she usually spends her time in the castle maintenance workshop tinkering with machines alongside the royal engineers. Even though she and Hodr are married, they both sleep in separate chambers. It is later revealed that Sigyn was in love with Rygart during their days in military school. Even after her marriage to Hodr, she still loves Rygart. While complimenting each other on their hair, Cleo says "Blonde hair...Is much prettier" to which an exhausted Sigyn replies "Black...For one single moment...I...Really....Liked it". Sigyn later petitions Hodr for a divorce, but he has yet to give her an answer. Regardless, Sigyn has been spending more and more time with Rygart in an attempt to help him overcome the guilt and trauma he has experienced on the battlefield.

Hodr is the 25-year-old king of Krisna and Sigyn's husband. He befriended Rygart at Assam military school when he ditched class to help him save an owl after he spotted him from his classroom's window. He was known as the "Crowned Prince" for staring at the sky and scoring failing grades. He does not want to be king, but tries to be a good leader and cares greatly for his people's lives. Despite being married with Sigyn, he does not shows any feelings for his wife and is aware she loves Rygart. During the cease-fire before the Battle of Binonten, Hodr reveals to Rygart that he has lost all romantic interest in Sigyn and that she has petitioned him for a divorce but later put it on hold. He then berates Rygart for not being honest about his feelings for Sigyn. In truth, he still loves Sigyn. However he suppresses it because he always knew Sigyn and Rygart have always loved each other. He has a younger sister named Lindy who is married to a General from the Orlando Empire.

Narvi is a 24-year-old female Upper Class Heavy Knight from Krisna. She previously served under General True before being assigned to command her own squad. As a squad leader she has a tendency to be brash and impulsive, always trying to be at the front of battle. Her actions are the result of her desire to prove her worth as a field commander, so that she may be able to serve in General True's inner circle of officers. She is devastated after finding that General True was killed in battle. After the Battle of Binonten, Narvi is promoted and becomes one of General Baldr's front-line commanders. She also receives a prototype new-model Golem with greater speed and maneuverability. She has feelings for Rygart.

Nile is Narvi's older brother and a First Class Heavy Knight.

A 29-year-old male Upper First Class Heavy Knight from Krisna who serves as a mech sniper. It is implied that he has a crush on Narvi.

A calm General and brilliant strategist. He is one of Krisna's most prized generals. He serves as a mentor to Rygart on becoming a soldier and is also his Commanding officer. He has a son named Girge but has since disowned him due to the latter killing one of his fellow cadets and injuring 8 others during a training exercise without reason. Baldr was away on border patrol when that incident occurred and has never been able to get the full story from his son or the reasons for his actions. Baldr attempts to ease Rygart's conscious after he delivers Girge's body to him. Baldr has shown great concern for Rygart, seeing how the pressures and traumas of the war have weighed on Rygart's mind, and is afraid they may drive Rygart down the same path that ultimately 'broke' his son.

A hot-headed General of Krisna who always immediately runs into the battle without strategy much to the trouble of those under his command. Despite these flaws, he is well loved by the people of Krisna due to donating all of his money to the orphanages of Krisna and even taking care of the orphans himself with two of those orphans being Narvi and Nile. He is killed at the end of Volume 4 due to his hot-headed impatience leading his forces right into an obvious ambush by the Athens Invasion Force.

A tall female military instructor for Krisna. She is an expert in close quarter melee combat.

A gifted mech pilot from Krisna and General Baldr's son. He was formerly serving in prison for killing one of his fellow cadets without reason during training but when Krisna needed more skilled mech pilots for the war, he is granted supervised release and assigned to Narvi's squad to help the war effort. He is skilled in sniping and using a Katana with his Golem, a modified Athens's Artemis and takes the opportunity when given the chance to fight other skilled mechs whether they be comrade or foe. Due to his attitude and past actions, General Baldr has ordered his squad-mates to execute him should Girge try to attack any of them. His instability was the result of the pressure trying to live up to people's expectations who expected him to follow in his father's footsteps. But what may have started his instability was when during his childhood, he and his father rescued a village from a group of escaped prisoners where he allowed his father to shoot him in the leg as a distraction when one of the prisoners took him hostage. Girge fights against several of General Borcuse's elite guard while protecting Rygart and the rest of his squad. He manages to severely damage or disable all of their heavy mechs before finally being disabled and captured. He is later killed by Borcuse by fooling the General into believing he is the pilot of the Delphine.

Rygart's younger brother. Like his brother, Regatz too is also an un-sorcerer.

Commonwealth of Athens

Zess is a 25-year-old soldier of Athens. He met Rygart at Assam military school, where he was called "straight-laced Zess". He was the best pilot cadet in the academy's history and was full of pride. He first met Rygart when Rygart was being bullied and refused to stand up for himself. Zess defended him and quickly befriended Rygart afterward. When he learns his nation plans to conquer Krisna, he leads his Valkyrie Squadron, a small commando strike force of mechs to the Krisna capital in order to make Hodr surrender quickly to spare his friends and their country from the wrath of the main Athens Invasion Army, unaware that the leaders of Athens gave an unofficial condition of surrendering to Hodr: The execution of the whole royal family, including Sigyn. Ultimately his mission is a failure which costs the lives of two of his subordinates and the capture of Cleo. In his last confrontation with Rygart, he is critically injured when his cockpit is crushed. He returns home to his wife and two-year-old daughter, all the while greatly regretting the consequences that awaits Krisna by the main Invasion force. After the death of General Borcuse, and at the request of his brother, he was ordered to lead the second Athenian invasion force. Zess's Valkyrie Squadron Golems are the lightweight mech, Artemis.

 A subordinate of Zess, Cleo is a 12-year-old mech pilot who looks like a teenager; her friend Lee used to make fun of her for being extremely developed for her age. She is a quick learner, but despite this she is very clumsy and somewhat a slow thinker with some subjects. She says her positive skills are cooking, laundry, and keeping watch without even getting tired. She graduated from military school after two years, when it ordinarily takes six years. When Cleo learns that Lee was killed in battle, Cleo believes Rygart killed her (unaware that Lee committed suicide) and initially wants to kill him. Afterward, she meets Rygart in battle and shows a surprising amount of skill contrary to how she was before, almost defeating Rygart. She is defeated shortly after securing Zess's escape and taken prisoner, where she was treated very leniently and shared a room with Sigyn. She initially tried to escape by securing Sigyn's gun and attempting to kill Rygart, but fails because the gun actually had no ammo. She befriends Sigyn and no longer tries to escape afterward. Later, she is released in a hostage exchange for Rygart and his squad. Her family has been serving the Athens military for three generations, with her grandmother a retired mech pilot who is now an Athens military academy instructor and her mother, a high-ranking officer in the Athens military.

A soldier of Athens and a subordinate of Zess. He is Zess's second in command.

A soldier of Athens who detests Krisna for their supposed "ruthless" acts during the previous war, though she seems unaware of Athens's own acts during it. She is friends with Cleo, where both of them went to military school together. During the attack at the Krisna's capital, Lee commits suicide after being saved by Rygart from another Krisna soldier attempting to finish her off, believing being dead is much better than being a prisoner of the Krisna "barbarians", devastating Rygart.

A soldier of Athens and a subordinate of Zess. He is the first to be killed by the Delphine.

The Secretary of War of the Commonwealth of Athens and Zess's older brother. He is the mastermind of the Athens Invasion of Krisna. Officially, he claims the invasion was to punish Krisna for harboring troops from Orlando, Athens' longtime enemy, during the previous war. However, in reality it is an excuse to claim Krisna's rich, extensive quartz mines as Athens' own quartz resources are dwindling. After Borcuse's death it is revealed that Loquis is suffering from a terminal illness and is bedridden. At his order, he promotes Zess to General and appoints him as the leader of the Second Krishna Invasion Force. He also asks for Zess to protect and raise his young son.

One of Athens's most infamous Generals. To his subordinates, he is seen as a loving father and a good friend, but in reality, he is a cold and calculating man who will not hesitate to commit heinous acts of barbarism to achieve his goals. Borcuse was placed under house arrest for committing a war crime during the Invasion of Assam, where he slaughtered innocent villagers and displayed their bodies as a way to intimidate and bait his enemies. The Athens government pardons Borcuse and makes him leader of the Krisna Invasion Force, believing that his tactics, while brutal, are the fastest way to defeat Krisna. He is a highly skilled mech pilot and is accompanied by five other specially chosen pilots who serve as his elite guard and troop commanders. When Borcuse attempts to slaughter a village to goad the Krisna forces, he is confronted by Rygart and the two duel. Rygart manages to deal a significant amount of damage to Borcuse's Golem but the General becomes 'bored' and disables the Delphine. Recognizing that the Delphine is ancient technology, Borcuse orders Rygart to be killed and his mech taken back to Athens but Rygart managed to escape, dealing a blow to Borcuse's pride. Borcuse's reputation suffers another blow when Girge duels and kills one of his commanders, Bades including the elite Golems that were accompanying Bades. Girge and Rygart are captured and brought before Borcuse where he proceeds to shoot Girge in the head prior to a prisoner exchange. Borcuse and Rygart engage in a rematch at the end of the Siege of Binonten, in which Rygart ultimately emerges the victor. Initially ordered to be taken as a prisoner, Borcuse taunts Rygart with memories of Girge, causing Rygart to kill the General. Borcuse's Golem is the Hykelion, a giant, black mech that possess a pair of "scorpion tails" on the shoulders that he uses as a secret weapon which he hides under his mech's cape.

Borcuse's second in command. Relatively young for a field commander, Io is greatly respected for both his prowess in battle and his abilities as a tactician. While he appears intimidating, due to his tall height and a large prominent scar on his face, Io is a kind man who treats civilians and children with respect. Io disapproves of the barbaric acts that Borcuse and his fellow commanders commit against civilians and enemy combatants. He is also in a relationship with Borcuse's daughter. As one of Borcuse's elite guard and commanders, Io rides the Toria, a blue-colored customized Golem which utilizes both swords and guns. After Borcuse is killed, Io returns to Athens and resigns from the military, guilt-ridden over his perceived inability to protect Borcuse and his fellow commanders.

One of Borcuse's elite guards and commanders. A bald, middle-aged man, he is Borcuse's Lieutenant and strategist. Unfortunately, Nike has no respect for him and usually insults him if his plans fails or makes fun of his baldness. After he and Borcuse's men were ambushed by Girge, which resulted in the death of several Athens pilots including his comrade Iris, he returns to face Girge again with the Spartans, an elite group of Athens pilots with customized Golems where he tries to convince Girge to side with Athens instead. However, Girge refuses and proceeds to kill all of the Spartans before finally killing Bades himself. His name is derived from the Greek god Hades. Bades' rides a customized gold-colored golem whose primary weapons are a heavy gun-lance and a powerful shoulder-mounted cannon.

One of Borcuse's elite guards and commanders. He is the oldest among Borcuse's inner circle. Iris is the first of Borcuse's inner circle to die as he was killed by Girge in an ambush after he and the rest of Borcuse's army escapes their first battle with General Baldr's army. Iris rides a customized white golem whose primary weapon is a heavy quart battle-ax.

One of Borcuse's elite guards and one of the two female commanders in his inner circle besides Leto. Despite looking like a child, Nike is actually 25 years old. While she display a look of a sweet, innocent girl, in reality she is a sadistic killer who will not hesitate to kill anyone who angers her, whether they be enemy or ally. Io is the only one who can calm Nike as he treats her like a little sister. Nike's Golem is the heavy mech Giratos, whose primary weapon is a pair of bladed arm shields, which when paired with the golem's enhanced arm strength allows it to crush and split enemy golems in half. This was what she uses to kill General True in the series. The story in the manga version is, during her first meeting with Girge, he disabled and used her Golem as a 'shield' while proceeding to damage the other Athens Golems, dealing a huge blow to her ego. Her second encounter with Girge fares no better as her Golem is decapitated. Making her way back to the main forces on foot, she encounters and battles Narvi, but in the end Narvi succeeds in shooting Nike through the heart, killing her but not before Narvi comforts her at her last moments.

One of Borcuse's elite guards and one of the two female commanders in his inner circle besides Nike. She serves as the intelligences officer and mech sniper. She also has feelings for Io. She joined Bades and the Spartans in their battle against Girge and was the only survivor, due in thanks that she was the group's sniper and suffered only minimal damage in that battle. After Borcuse's death and her return to Athens, she is deeply upset when she learns that Io has resigned from the military. She confronts him and berates him for 'betraying' their friends' memories and that he has an obligation to avenge them. Io agrees with her accusations, but she can only watch tearfully as he walks away saying that he no longer has the will to fight.

General Borcuse's daughter. Leda is in love with Io and gets jealous if another woman is interested in him.

The Empire of Orlando
The Empress
A young girl who is the 162nd Empress of Orlando who is loved by her citizens. In reality, she is rather devious and calculating.

Aruvia
The Chief Cleric of Orlando.

General Cain
A General of Orlando and Hodr's brother in law. He was to lead the Orlando Expedition forces to help Krisna against the Athens Invasion force by the order of his Empress, but at the last moment she had him replaced with General Molak due to his relationship as King Hodr's brother in law as the Empress changed plans to have the Expedition forces intervene only after Athens severely weakened Krisna so they may eliminate both sides and take over Krisna for Orlando. Nevertheless, Cain joined the expedition, hoping to save both Hodr and Krisna.

General Molak
General Cain's replacement for the Orlando Expedition forces. Molak is a masked young woman who is very loyal to her country yet is smart to realize the politics being played in the empire. While she has orders to ensure Cain does not interfere in her mission, she still respects him and gives him some leeway over his concern for his brother in law.

Lindy
General Cain's wife, Hodr's younger sister and Sigyn's sister in law. She is a good friend of the Empress.

A merchant and engineer who provides and assists Sigyn in making the Quartz armor and weapon for Rygart's Delphine during the sixth movie.

Media

Manga
Written and illustrated by Yunosuke Yoshinaga, Broken Blade has been serialized by Flex Comix in the Shounen web manga anthologies Shonen Blood in October and November 2006 issues and FC Blood from January 1, 2007 to February 8, 2012, and in the Seinen manga anthology Comic Meteo since July 25, 2012. The chapters have been published into tankōbon volumes since April 10, 2007. As of 2022, there has been 20 tankōbon volumes and 103 chapters. CMX released the first three volumes of the series in English.

Films
The films were chief directed by Tetsurō Amino, directed by Nobuyoshi Habara and produced by Production I.G and XEBEC. While the films mostly follow the manga story, for episode six, the animators deviated from the manga to end the story with their own plot.

Film list

Television anime
The Broken Blade films have been adapted and edited into a 12-episode anime series by Production I.G and XEBEC, including scenes never featured in the original movies. The series was aired between April and June 2014 on Tokyo MX and BS11 stations in Japan. Both OP and ending themes were performed by both Sayaka Sasaki and Aira Yuhki.

References

External links
Broken Blade official film website 
Flex Comix Official Broken Blade website 

Broken Blade Streaming on Crunchyroll

2007 manga
2010 anime films
2011 anime films
Action anime and manga
CMX (comics) titles
Comic Meteor manga
Comics about magic
FlexComix Blood and FlexComix Next manga
IG Port franchises
Japanese webcomics
Mecha anime and manga
Production I.G
Sentai Filmworks
Seinen manga
Xebec (studio)
Webcomics in print